Martin Roscoe (born 3 August 1952) is an English classical pianist.  He performs as a concerto soloist, as a recitalist and as a chamber musician.

Early life
Martin Roscoe was born in Halton, Runcorn, Cheshire. He first became serious about music at the age of 7 after being ‘bowled over’ by a performance at The Proms of the Symphonie Fantastique by Berlioz on 19 August 1959.  He later went on to study at the Royal Manchester College of Music with Gordon Green and Marjorie Clementi. Awards early in his career included the Davas Gold Medal in 1973, the Silver Medal of the Worshipful Company of Musicians in 1974, the British Liszt Piano Competition in 1976 and he was a prizewinner in the Sydney International Piano Competition in 1981.

Career

Roscoe has developed close links with the Royal Liverpool Philharmonic Orchestra, the BBC National Orchestra of Wales and the Manchester Camerata. He has played as a soloist under many of the world's leading conductors, including Simon Rattle, Kent Nagano, Libor Pešek, Luciano Berio, Yan Pascal Tortelier, Andrew Litton and Mark Wigglesworth. He gives regular recitals at the Wigmore Hall.  Roscoe has appeared in BBC Henry Wood Promenade Concerts on six occasions and has made over 300 broadcasts with the BBC.  He has an international reputation and has played in many countries, including Hong Kong, Singapore, Spain, Switzerland, South America, Australia, USA and France.

As a student he formed a piano duo with Peter Donohoe and they have performed and made recordings together since.  Their recording of music by Gershwin on Carlton Classics was chosen as Editor's Choice in the August 1997 issue of Gramophone. As a chamber musician he has performed with Tasmin Little, Emma Johnson, Steven Isserlis, Michael Collins, Steven Osborne, the Leopold String Trio and the Chilingirian, Vanbrugh, Tale, Schidlof, Carmina, Brodsky, Endellion and Sorrel String Quartets. The details of Roscoe's recordings are shown in the table below.

Before becoming a teacher at the Guildhall School of Music & Drama, Roscoe had held positions at the Royal Northern College of Music and the Royal Academy of Music. He is the artistic director of the Beverley Chamber Music Festival and the Ribble Valley International Piano Week. He has been granted an honorary Doctorate of Music by the University of Hull.

Discography

Notes

1952 births
Living people
English classical pianists
Male classical pianists
Academics of the Royal Academy of Music
Piano pedagogues
People from Runcorn
Alumni of the Royal Northern College of Music
Sydney International Piano Competition prize-winners
21st-century classical pianists
21st-century British male musicians